Mochalov (masculine) or Mochalova (feminine) is a Russian surname. Notable people with the surname include:

Eduard Mochalov (born 1974), Russian dissident and writer
Pavel Mochalov (1800–1848), Russian actor

Russian-language surnames